Sloup is a market town in Blansko District in the South Moravian Region of the Czech Republic. It has about 1,000 inhabitants.

Geography
It lies in the Drahany Highlands. Sloup lies on the northern border of the Moravian Karst Protected Landscape Area. In the municipality is located part of the Sloupsko-šošůvské jeskyně Nature Reserve ("Sloup-Šošůvka Caves").

History
The first written mention of Sloup is from 1373.

Sights
The landmark of the market town is the Church of Our Lady of Sorrows. The church was built in the Baroque style in 1751–1754. It is an important regional Marian pilgrimage site, connected with a statue of Our Lady of Sorrows.

The cave system is the largest accessible cave system in the country. Its part, which is located on the territory of the municipality, includes the Kůlna Cave which became a remarkable European Paleolithic site since the 1880s.

References

External links

Populated places in Blansko District
Market towns in the Czech Republic